The Zugot  ( hazZūgōṯ, "the Pairs"), also called Zugoth   or Zugos  in the Ashkenazi pronunciation, refers both to the two-hundred-year period ( 170 BCE – 30 CE,  Təqūfaṯ hazZūgōṯ, "Era of the Pairs") during the later Second Temple period in which the spiritual leadership of the Jews was in the hands of five successions of "pairs" of religious teachers, and to each of these pairs themselves.

Origin of the name

In Hebrew, the word zûghôth indicates pairs of two identical objects, plural of zûgh, a pair. The word is related to Arabic zawj (زوج) as singular and zawjaat as plural, "spouse", and Aramaic zôghāʾ, "pair, spouse", from a root meaning "to join" ultimately borrowed from Greek zugón (ζυγόν), "yoke".

Roles
The zugoth were five pairs of scholars who ruled a supreme court ( bêth dîn ha-gādôl) of the Jews as nasi ("prince", i.e. president) and av beit din ("father of Beth Din", i.e. chief justice) respectively. After this period, the positions nasi and av beit din remained, but they were not zugot.

The title of av beit din existed before the period of the zugot. His purpose was to oversee the Sanhedrin, the court of religious law also known as the "beit din". The rank of nasi ("prince") was a new institution that was begun during this period.

List of zugot 
There were five pairs of these teachers:

 Jose ben Joezer and Jose ben Jochananwho flourished at the time of the Maccabean revolt
 Joshua ben Perachiah and Nittai of Arbela,at the time of John Hyrcanus
 Judah ben Tabbai and Simeon ben Shetach,at the time of Alexander Jannaeus and Salome Alexandra
 Shmaya and Abtalion,at the time of Hyrcanus II
 Hillel the Elder and Shammai,at the time of King Herod the Great

Other uses of term zugot 
The term zûghôth refers to pairs generally. The Babylonian Talmud contains an extensive discussion of dangers of zûghôth and of performing various activities in pairs. The discussants expressed belief in a demonology and in practices of sorcery from which protection was needed by avoiding certain activities. The demonology included a discussion of Ashmidai (Asmodai or Asmodeus), referred to as king of the shedim "demons".

However, later generations did not make efforts to avoid harm from zugot, and their rabbis suggest various reasons why this is the case. Menachem Meiri stated that belief in the harm of pairs was widespread among the masses of the time and the Sages sought to allay their fears and draw them away from their excesses. Tosafot ruled that the rules regarding zugot need not be followed, as these evil spirits are no longer prevalent. The Tur included the zugot rules in his code, but the Beit Yosef disputed this based on Tosafot. The Shulchan Aruch and Mishneh Torah do not mention concern for zugot. Most recent poskim, including Ben Yehoyada of Yosef Hayyim, do not require concern for zugot.

References 

 
Jewish history by period